Sinningia gerdtiana is a tuberous member of the flowering plant family Gesneriaceae. It is found in Brazil.

References

External links

gerdtiana
Flora of Brazil